A sarcophagus (: sarcophagi or sarcophaguses) is a coffin, most commonly carved in stone, and usually displayed above ground, though it may also be buried. The word sarcophagus comes from the Greek σάρξ  meaning "flesh", and φαγεῖν  meaning "to eat"; hence sarcophagus means "flesh-eating", from the phrase lithos sarkophagos (λίθος σαρκοφάγος), "flesh-eating stone". The word also came to refer to a particular kind of limestone that was thought to rapidly facilitate the decomposition of the flesh of corpses contained within it due to the chemical properties of the limestone itself.

History of the sarcophagus 
Sarcophagi were most often designed to remain above ground. The earliest stone sarcophagi were used by Egyptian pharaohs of the 3rd dynasty, which reigned from about 2686 to 2613 B.C.

The Hagia Triada sarcophagus is a stone sarcophagus elaborately painted in fresco; one style of later Ancient Greek sarcophagus in painted pottery is seen in Klazomenian sarcophagi, produced around the Ionian Greek city of Klazomenai, where most examples were found, between 550 BC (Late Archaic) and 470 BC. They are made of coarse clay in shades of brown to pink. Added to the basin-like main sarcophagus is a broad, rectangular frame, often covered with a white slip and then painted. The huge Lycian Tomb of Payava, now in the British Museum, is a royal tomb monument of about 360 BC designed for an open-air placing, a grand example of a common Lycian style.

Ancient Roman sarcophagi—sometimes metal or plaster as well as limestone—were popular from about the reign of Trajan, and often elaborately carved, until the early Christian burial preference for interment underground, often in a limestone sepulchre, led to their falling out of favor. However, there are many important Early Christian sarcophagi from the 3rd to 4th centuries. Most Roman examples were designed to be placed against a wall and are decorated on three sides only. Sarcophagi continued to be used in Christian Europe for important figures, especially rulers and leading church figures, and by the High Middle Ages often had a recumbent tomb effigy lying on the lid. More plain sarcophagi were placed in crypts. The most famous examples include the Habsburg Imperial Crypt in Vienna, Austria. The term tends to be less often used to describe Medieval, Renaissance, and later examples.

In the early modern period, lack of space tended to make sarcophagi impractical in churches, but chest tombs or false sarcophagi, empty and usually bottomless cases placed over an underground burial, became popular in outside locations such as cemeteries and churchyards, especially in Britain in the 18th and 19th centuries, where memorials were mostly not highly decorated and the extra cost of a false sarcophagus over a headstone acted as an indication of social status.

United States of America

Sarcophagi, usually "false", made a return to the cemeteries of America during the last quarter of the 19th century, at which time, according to a New York company which built sarcophagi, "it was decidedly the most prevalent of all memorials in our cemeteries". They continued to be popular into the 1950s, at which time the popularity of flat memorials (making for easier grounds maintenance) made them obsolete. Nonetheless, a 1952 catalog from the memorial industry still included eight pages of them, broken down into Georgian and Classical detail, a Gothic and Renaissance adaptation, and a Modern variant. The image shows sarcophagi from the late 19th century located in Laurel Hill Cemetery in Philadelphia, Pennsylvania. The one in the back, the Warner Monument created by Alexander Milne Calder (1879), features the spirit or soul of the deceased being released.

Asia
In the Mekong Delta in southwestern Vietnam, it is common for families to inter their members in sarcophagi near their homes, thus allowing ready access for visits as a part of the indigenous tradition of ancestor worship.

In Sulawesi, Indonesia, waruga are a traditional form of sarcophagus.

India
Nearly 140 years after British archaeologist Alexander Rea unearthed a sarcophagus from the hillocks of Pallavaram in Tamil Nadu, an identical artifact dating back by more than 2,000 years has been discovered in the same locality.

Spain
Phoenician and Paleochristian sarcophagi have been found in the Iberian Peninsula.

See also 

 Crypt
 Mausoleum
 Ossuary

References

Bibliography
 Mont Allen, "Sarcophagus", in The Oxford Encyclopedia of Ancient Greece and Rome, edited by Michael Gagarin, vol. 6, p. 214–218 (Oxford: Oxford University Press, 2010).
 Robert Manuel Cook, Clazomenian Sarcophagi (Mainz: Philipp von Zabern, 1981).
 R. R. R. Smith, Sculptured for Eternity: Treasures of Hellenistic, Roman, and Byzantine Art from Istanbul Archaeological Museum (Istanbul: Ertuǧ and Kocabıyık, 2001).
 Paul Zanker and Björn C. Ewald, Living with Myths: The Imagery of Roman Sarcophagi (Oxford: Oxford University Press, 2012).

External links 

 Egyptian sarcophagi
 sarcophagi in the Istanbul Archaeological Museum
 

 
Burial monuments and structures
Sculpture
Stone monuments and memorials